Kim is a surname with multiple origins.

Korean family name

Kim, sometimes spelt Gim, is the most common family name in Korea.

Other derivations
People with the surname Kim, but unrelated to the Korean root above, include:

 Andy Kim, Canadian musician, born Andrew Youakim
 Sandra Kim, Belgian singer, born Sandra Caldarone

Fictional characters
Fictional characters with the surname Kim, whether or not any indication is given of ethnic origins, include:
In Fatal Fury and The King of Fighters game series
 Kim Kaphwan
 Kim Dong Hwan or Kim Jae Hoon, regular characters in Garou: Mark of the Wolves
 Kim Sue Il in Kizuna Encounter
Other
 Harry Kim in the television series Star Trek: Voyager
 Hyun-Woo Kim, a protagonist from the anime series The Haunted House 
 Lane Kim in the television series Gilmore Girls

See also
Kim (given name)
Kim (disambiguation) (other meanings)